Stephen Dixon or Steve Dixon may refer to:

 Stephen Dixon (author) (1936–2019), American author
 Stephen Dixon (cricketer) (born 1958), former English cricketer
 Stephen Dixon (ice hockey) (born 1985), Canadian professional ice hockey player
 Stephen Dixon (newsreader) (born 1974), English news presenter
 Stephen Dixon (ceramist) (born 1957), British ceramic artist
 Steve Dixon (actor) (born 1956), British actor and academic
 Steve Dixon (baseball) (born 1969), former Major League Baseball pitcher

See also
 Steven Dixon, American baseball player
 Steven Dickson (disambiguation)
 Dixon (surname)